Teodor Cristian Rus (born 30 April 1974) is a Romanian former football midfielder and current manager.

References

1974 births
Living people
Romanian footballers
ACF Gloria Bistrița players
FC 08 Homburg players
Rot-Weiß Oberhausen players
Karlsruher SC players
SV Waldhof Mannheim players
FC Rot-Weiß Erfurt players
FC Nöttingen players
2. Bundesliga players
Association football midfielders
Romanian expatriate footballers
Expatriate footballers in Germany
Romanian expatriate sportspeople in Germany
Romanian football managers
Romanian expatriate football managers
Expatriate football managers in Germany
People from Aiud